Đevrske is a village located in Kistanje municipality, 10 km southwest of Kistanje, in the continental part of Šibenik-Knin County, Croatia.  

Archaeological procedures began in 19th century. Medieval graveyards, containing graves adorned with jewellery and stirrups have been found which date from 9-11.th century along with several medieval tombstones.

Demographics 

In the census of 1991, for Djevrske there were 836 inhabitants of the following nationalities:

References 

Populated places in Šibenik-Knin County
Archaeological sites in Croatia